Muscular Judaism is a term coined by Max Nordau in his speech at the Second Zionist Congress held in Basel on August 28, 1898. In his speech, he spoke about the need to design the "new Jew" and reject the "old Jew", with the mental and physical strength to achieve the goals of Zionism. Nordau saw Muscular Judaism as an answer to Judennot ("Jewish distress").

History

The term refers to the cultivation of mental and physical properties, such as mental and physical strengths, agility and discipline, which all will be necessary for the national revival of the Jewish people. The characteristics of the muscular Jews are the exact opposite, an antithesis, of the Diaspora Jew, especially in Eastern Europe, as shown in the anti-Semitic literature and in the Haskalah movement's literature. Nordau saw the promotion of muscular, athletic Jews as a counterpoint to such depictions of Jews as a weak people. In addition, the "muscular" Jew is the opposite of the rabbinic or Haskalah Jew — the man of letters, the intellectual — who was said to be busy all his life engaging with esoteric subjects. His body, and his will, grew weak.

Though Muscular Judaism was an idea practiced mostly by male Jews, Jewish women participated as well, especially in activities such as gymnastics.

At the time of Nordau's speech, the idea of Muscular Christianity was already widespread in various Christian countries.

Jewish athletes in Europe
European Jewish leaders heeded Nordau's philosophy. Between 1896 and 1936, Jewish athletes won disproportionational amount of medals for Austria at the Olympics than their proportion of the total Austrian population.

Nordau's idea of Muscular Judaism also inspired the founders of Hakoah Vienna, a Viennese sports club especially well known for its football team. American journalist Franklin Foer has written that Hakoah (Hebrew for "the strength") was "one of the best teams on the planet" at its height in the mid-1920s. Hakoah players decorated their uniforms with Jewish symbols, such as the Star of David, and adopted nicknames of historical Jewish military leaders, such as Bar Kochba.

See also
Diaspora Jew
Maccabi youth movement
Maccabi World Union
Jewish Olympics
Judenklub
Nationalism and sport
Muscular Christianity
Muscular Liberalism
Jutrzenka Krakow

References

1898 in Judaism
1898 in Switzerland
Jewish movements
History of Zionism
1890s neologisms
Jewish sports
Physical culture
Masculinity